Rush Township is the name of some places in the U.S. state of Pennsylvania:

Rush Township, Centre County, Pennsylvania
Rush Township, Dauphin County, Pennsylvania
Rush Township, Northumberland County, Pennsylvania
Rush Township, Schuylkill County, Pennsylvania
Rush Township, Susquehanna County, Pennsylvania

Pennsylvania township disambiguation pages

ja:ラッシュ郡区